Johan Petter Krafman better known by his stage name Midnight Boy (born 6 April 1988 in Helsingborg, Sweden) is a Swedish singer and songwriter. His music is strongly inspired by 1980s electropop and rock.

Career
Krafman's career started in the summer of 2008 when he participated in the talent show Artistjakten by Mix Megapol, a Swedish national radio station. Winning the competition, he was awarded a record deal with Universal. He also performed at the Ladies Night shows in Stockholm, Gothenburg and Malmö with the singer Martin Stenmarck, actor Peter Stormare and comedian Henrik Hjelt.  In connection with the Ladies Night tour he released two songs called "Disarmed" and "Chain Reaction" under his regular name. The songs were written and produced by Tony Nilsson and Peter Boström.

In 2013, Midnight Boy released the single "Roll With It" using his newly adopted stage name. The single was released by the newly started record company 100 Songs, specializing solely in single releases. The song took Midnight Boy to a mini tour to United States, where he performed at the Avalon club in Los Angeles. Also in 2013, Midnight Boy released the single "When You're Strange" with a controversial music video, where he took off all of his clothes at Stureplan with the slogan "When naked, there is no difference". He also worked with several songwriters and record producers.

Midnight Boy participated in the fourth semifinal of Melodifestivalen 2015 with the song "Don't Say No". The song did not get further in the competition, but charted in Sverigetopplistan making it his first charting single in the official Swedish Singles Chart.

Discography

Singles

References

External links 
Official website

Living people
1988 births
Swedish pop singers
Swedish songwriters
21st-century Swedish singers
21st-century Swedish male singers
Melodifestivalen contestants of 2015